Ali Ahmadi may refer to:

 Ali Ahmadi (nomad), gladiator on the 2008 Australian TV series Gladiators
 Ali Ahmadi (Afghan footballer)
 Ali Ahmadi (Iranian footballer) (born 1994)

See also 
 Ali-Asghar Ahmadi (born 1956), Iranian reformist politician